The Sunbury Football Netball Club, nicknamed Lions, is an Australian rules football and netball club based in the Victorian town of Sunbury. The football team currently competes in the Ballarat Football League.

History
Sunbury Football Club was formed in 1879 when it was known as the Lions, They were a founding club and continued playing in the Riddell District Football League until 1996.
With the depth of football standard in the RDFL on the decline, together with considerable opposition from former second division clubs on the formation of one division, the club voted to make the move to the highly rated Ballarat Football League with Melton, Darley and Melton South clubs for the commencement of the 1997 playing season.

The club has won five BFL premierships.

Premierships
Ballarat Football League
1997, 1998, 1999, 2004, 2012
Riddell District Football League
1892, 1901, 1906, 1908, 1913, 1915, 1953, 1955, 1957, 1969, 1974, 1976, 1977, 1980, 1982, 1987, 1988, 1990, 1996

Bibliography
 History of Football in the Ballarat District by John Stoward -

References

External links
 Official website

Ballarat Football League clubs
Essendon District Football League clubs
Australian rules football clubs established in 1880
Sports clubs established in 1880
1880 establishments in Australia
Sunbury, Victoria
Netball teams in Victoria (Australia)
Australian rules football clubs in Victoria (Australia)
Sport in the City of Hume